Waterboro may refer to a place in the United States:

Waterboro, Maine
Waterboro, New York